is a craft brewery in the Lambrate district of Milan, Italy, founded in 1996.

References

External links 

 

Beer brands of Italy
Pubs
Manufacturing companies based in Milan
Italian companies established in 1996
Food and drink companies established in 1996